Håkan boma ye! was released on 5 December 2014, and is a Håkan Hellström live album. It was recorded during his concert at Ullevi in Gothenburg in Sweden on 7 June 2014, and was subsequently released as CD and LP.

Track listing

CD

CD 1
Tro och tvivel
En vän med en bil
Du kan gå din egen väg
Nu kan du få mig så lätt
Man måste dö några gånger innan man kan leva
Zigenarliv dreamin'
Vid protesfabrikens stängsel
Jag har varit i alla städer
Gårdakvarnar och skit
Dom där jag kommer från/Ju mer dom spottar
Kom igen Lena
Brännö serenad
När lyktorna tänds

CD 2
Shelley
Klubbland
Pistol
För sent för edelweiss
Jag vet inte vem jag är men jag vet att jag är din
Mitt gullbergs kaj paradis
Kärlek är ett brev skickat tusen gånger
Hela huset
En midsommarnattsdröm
Ramlar
Det är så jag säger det

CD 3
Valborg
Känn ingen sorg för mig Göteborg
Det kommer aldrig va över för mig
Du är snart där
Bara dårar rusar in

LP

1A
Tro och tvivel
En vän med en bil
 Du kan gå din egen väg
Nu kan du få mig så lätt

1B
Man måste dö några gånger innan man kan leva
Zigenarliv dreamin'
Vid protesfabrikens stängsel
Jag har varit i alla städer

2A
Gårdakvarnar och skit
Dom där jag kommer från/Ju mer dom spottar
Kom igen Lena

2B
Brännö serenad
När lyktorna tänds
Shelley
Klubbland
Pistol

3A
För sent för edelweiss
Jag vet inte vem jag är men jag vet att jag är din
Mitt Gullbergs kaj paradis
Kärlek är ett brev skickat tusen gånger

3B
Hela huset
En midsommarnattsdröm
Ramlar

4A
Det är så jag säger det
Valborg
Känn ingen sorg för mig Göteborg

4B
Det kommer aldrig va över för mig
Du är snart där
Bara dårar rusar in

Charts

Weekly charts

Year-end charts

References 

2014 live albums
Live albums by Swedish artists
Håkan Hellström albums
Swedish-language live albums